Chimera Strain (initially known as Chimera) is a 2018 science fiction drama/thriller film written and directed by Maurice Haeems, and produced by Jay Sitaram and Maurice Haeems.

Plot
A genius but mentally unbalanced scientist, Quint, attempts to save his terminally ill children, Miles and Flora, by freezing them alive through cryptobiosis. He operates out of a remote, abandoned, and isolated research facility where he clandestinely brings the comatose body of his estranged wife, Jessie, so that he may experiment on her and find a cure for his children. He buries himself in research, and motivated by the fear of loss, he works day and night to find a cure to their deadly genetic disease. He intends to decode the DNA of the Turritopsis jellyfish which are biologically immortal and possess the ability to transdifferentiate. However, Quint faces a number of obstacles, distractions, and antagonists in the form of Jessie’s spirit, his former flame Charlie, and his erstwhile employer Masterson.

Cast
 Henry Ian Cusick as Quint
 Kathleen Quinlan as Masterson
 Erika Ervin as Dita Gruze
 Jenna Harrison as Charlie
 Karishma Ahluwalia as Jessie
 Jennifer Gjulameti as Griffin
 Raviv Haeems as Miles
 Kaavya Jayaram as Flora

Release
The film was released in select theatres and VOD on March 15, 2019 and on DVD on April 16, 2019 by Vertical Entertainment and Lionsgate.

Accolades
Chimera Strain won the following awards:

 Boston International Film Festival 2018 – Best Narrative Feature
 International Horror & Sci-Fi Film Festival 2018 – Best Sci-Fi Feature
 LUSCA Fantastic Film Festival 2018 – Best International Feature Film
 PDXtreme: Portland Underground Film Festival 2019 – Best Feature Film
 Phoenix Film Festival 2018 – Phoenix Film Foundation Best Sci-Fi Feature
 Puerto Rico Horror Film Festival 2018 – Jury Prize Best Feature Film
 Rome International Film Festival 2018 – Best Narrative Feature

The cast and crew of Chimera Strain won the following awards for their work on the film.

 Henry Ian Cusick – Best Actor at PDXtreme: Portland Underground Film Festival 2019
 Kathleen Quinlan – Best Supporting Actress at FilmQuest 2018
 Kathleen Quinlan – Best Supporting Role at NOLA Horror Film Festival 2018
 David Kruta – Best Cinematography at Boston International Film Festival 2018
 Lawrence Sampson – Best Production Design at New York City Independent Film Festival 2018
 Sara Mills-Broffman – Best Costumes at New York City Independent Film Festival 2018

References

External links

2018 films
American science fiction drama films
American science fiction thriller films
Indian science fiction drama films
Indian science fiction thriller films
2010s English-language films
2010s American films